Miss Brazil World 2009 was the 20th edition of the Miss Brazil World pageant and 4th under MMB Productions & Events. The contest took place on July 4, 2009. Each state, the Federal District and various Insular Regions competed for the title. Tamara Almeida of Minas Gerais crowned Luciana Reis of Roraima at the end of the contest. Bertolini represented Brazil at Miss World 2009. The contest was held at the Hotel do Frade in Angra dos Reis, Rio de Janeiro, Brazil.

Results

Regional Queens of Beauty

Special Awards

Challenge Events

Beauty with a Purpose

Beach Beauty Brazil

Best Model Brazil

Miss Popularity UOL

Miss Sportswoman Brazil

Miss Talent

Delegates
The delegates for Miss Brazil World 2009 were:

States

 - Karine Osório
 - Camila Reis
 - Thalita Andrade
 - Cecília Stadler
 - Amanda Fróes
 - Lillyan di Cárlly
 - Lívia Nepomuceno
 - Lívia Barraque
 - Maysa Chagas
 - Rafaella Lino
 - Larissa Berté
 - Lorena Bueri
 - Jeanine de Castro
 - Aline Silveira
 - Alessandra Vilela
 - Cristiane Kampa
 - Karine Barros
 - Verbiany Leal
 - Mariana Notarângelo
 - Daliane Menezes
 - Catiane Fredrez
 - Érica Henrique
 - Luciana Reis
 - Karine Nunes
 - Jocasta Costa
 - Isabel Correa
 - Karen Jasper

Insular Regions

 Abrolhos - Renata Marzolla
 Atol das Rocas - Tatiana Kochi
 Campeche Island - Anelise Laulau
 Fernando de Noronha - Raquel Pedonni
 Ilhabela - Karen Rizzato
 Ilha de Itamaracá - Mírian Suzy
 Ilha do Marajó - Jordana Sidô
 Ilha dos Marinheiros - Débora Secchi
 Santa Catarina Island - Elisa Hoeppers
 São Pedro e São Paulo - Harumi Onomich
 Trindade e Martim Vaz - Flávia Monteiro

References

External links
 Official site (in Portuguese)

2009
2009 in Brazil
2009 beauty pageants